Tarlan Ahmadli (born on 21 November 1994) is an Azerbaijani professional footballer who plays as a goalkeeper for Turan-Tovuz in the Azerbaijan Premier League.

Club career
On 20 December 2013, Ahmadli made his debut in the Azerbaijan Premier League for Sumgayit match against Khazar Lankaran.

Career statistics

Club

Honours
Khazar Baku
Azerbaijan First Division (1): 2017–18

International
Azerbaijan U23
 Islamic Solidarity Games: (1) 2017

References

External links
 

1994 births
Living people
Association football goalkeepers
Azerbaijani footballers
Sumgayit FK players
Sabah FC (Azerbaijan) players
Gabala FC players
Azerbaijan Premier League players
Azerbaijan youth international footballers